Leonina may refer to:

 Leonina (coin), a coin issued under Pope Leo XII : see Papal mint
 Civitas Leonina, the Leonine City, a part of the city of Rome

See also
 Leonine (disambiguation)
 Leoninus (disambiguation)
 Leoninum